This article lists the airlift squadrons of the United States Air Force. The purpose of an airlift squadron is to organize and effect the delivery of supplies or personnel, usually via military transport aircraft such as the C-17 Globemaster III and C-130 Hercules.

Airlift squadrons

See also 
 List of United States Air Force squadrons

Airlift